Andre DeShawn Dickens (born June 17, 1974) is an American politician and nonprofit executive who is the 61st and current mayor of Atlanta, Georgia. He was a member of the Atlanta City Council and defeated council president Felicia Moore in the second round of Atlanta's 2021 mayoral election. He is the chief development officer at TechBridge, a nonprofit technology organization. He served as the chairperson of the transportation committee and chaired on the Public Safety and Legal Administration Committee.

Personal life 
Mayor Andre Dickens was the chief development officer for Tech Bridge; this non-profit offers affordable technology and business expertise to other nonprofits in underserved areas. In 2018, Dickens co-founded a Technology Career Program for the unemployed to be able to learn new tech skills and other IT training to take advantage of the booming tech jobs market. Mayor Andre Dickens also serves on the Georgia Tech Alumni Board, the Alumnus Leadership Atlanta, Diversity Leadership Atlanta, United Way VI, and Regional Leadership Institute. Dickens is also a Brother of Kappa Alpha Psi that he joined when attending Georgia Tech.

Dickens is a deacon at the New Horizon Baptist Church in Northwest Atlanta. He has one daughter, Bailey.

Early life and education 
Dickens was born on June 17, 1974, in Atlanta. Raised by his mother Sylvia Dickens and stepfather who adopted him and his other two siblings at the age of 7. While spending time with his step-father they often bonded over taking things apart and rebuilding them which birthed Dickens' passion for engineering. He grew up in Southwest Atlanta, and attended Benjamin Elijah Mays High School before enrolling at the Georgia Institute of Technology, where he received his degree in Chemical Engineering in 1998. Dickens received his Master's of Public Administration in Economic Development from Georgia State University.

Early career 
While being enrolled at Georgia Tech Andre Dickens began his professional career in 1994 as a part-time chemical engineer for BP-Amoco. Immediately after getting his degree the position at BP-Amoco became full-time. In 1999, Mayor Dickens, was employed at DSM Engineering and Plastics where he was a sales engineer. As a sales engineer his contribution to the company were recognized as he was named the first Black salesman of the year. After his time spent as a sales engineer at twenty-eight years old Dickens alongside his older sister co-founded City-Living Home Furnishing. The furnishing company was around for nine years from 2002 to 2011 and became a multi-million dollar business in only two locations. Unfortunately due to the housing crisis Dickens was unable to keep the company alive and in 2010 he filed for Chapter Seven bankruptcy.  

In 2013 Andre Dickens, was elected as an at-large City Council member. From 2014 to 2021 he mainly advocated for the improvement of Atlanta's public safety, the need for affordable housing, having programs for citizens, and creating more opportunities to students in Atlanta's Public School system. One of his most important contributions to the city while on City Council was his sponsorship of legislation that made the minimum wage for city employees fifteen dollars an hour. In addition to changing the minimum wage he created the Department of Transportation, the BeltLine Inclusionary Zoning which increased affordable housing in the area, and the Atlanta Youth Commission.

Mayor of Atlanta

On February 25, 2022, Dickens lifted the indoor COVID-19 mask mandate in Atlanta, ending a near 2 year restriction on restaurants, hotels, and other venues. 

During his first year in office, Mayor Andre Dickens made one of Atlanta's largest-ever, single-housing investments, committing more than $100 million to new and updated housing. The Dickens administration continues to partner with and leverage tools such as inclusionary zoning to assist with this investment. In order to offer affordable housing alongside increasing interest rates, new developments in areas with major public interest such as Westside Park and the BeltLine will take precedence.

Mayor Dickens' early accomplishments in office include the city's first-ever investment in early childhood education and the creation of a Nightlife Division to combat establishments with a history of violent crime.

During Mayor Dickens' term, over $13 million in funding has been set aside to combat homelessness, with the help of the LIFT 2.0 homeless response plan. By the end of 2024, the City hopes to achieve its goal of providing 1,500 housing placements for impoverished families by collaborating with local government, corporations, nonprofits, and community members.

In October 2022, Mayor Andre Dickens appointed Darin Schierbaum as Atlanta’s 26th Chief of Atlanta Police Department

Electoral history 

A member of the Democratic party, Andre Dickens first served for the Atlanta city council in 2013. In 2017, as an incumbent he ran unopposed in the general election for the At-Large Post 3 seat for city council. After two terms on city council, Andre ran for mayor of Atlanta. Throughout his campaign he captured numerous endorsements ranging from state senators to local influential leaders in the community. Dickens captured 23% of the vote in the general election to edge Kasim Reed for the second spot in the runoff race. Although Dickens did not win the 2021 Atlanta mayoral primary election (coming in second place), he won the following runoff election by a wide margin.

References

External links 
Campaign website

1974 births
20th-century African-American people
21st-century African-American politicians
21st-century American politicians
African-American mayors in Georgia (U.S. state)
Atlanta City Council members
Candidates in the 2021 United States elections
Georgia (U.S. state) Democrats
Georgia State University alumni
Georgia Tech alumni
Living people
Mayors of Atlanta